Tour of Vendée is a single-day road bicycle race held annually in October (Previously May) in the region of Vendée, France, finishing in a circuit inside La Roche-sur-Yon town. From 2005 until 2009, the race was organized as a 1.1 event on the UCI Europe Tour, moving to 1.HC classification in 2010, and also being part of the Coupe de France de cyclisme sur route. Between 1972 and 1979 it was an amateur race.

Winners

References

UCI Europe Tour races
Recurring sporting events established in 1972
1972 establishments in France
Cycle races in France